The Bad Popes is a 1969 book by E. R. Chamberlin that documents the lives of eight of the most controversial popes (papal years in parentheses):
Pope Stephen VI (896–897), who had his predecessor Pope Formosus exhumed, tried, de-fingered, briefly reburied, and thrown in the Tiber.
Pope John XII (955–964), who gave land to a mistress, murdered several people, and was killed by a man who caught him in bed with his wife.
Pope Benedict IX (1032–1044, 1045, 1047–1048), who "sold" the Papacy.
Pope Boniface VIII (1294–1303), who is lampooned in Dante's Divine Comedy.
Pope Urban VI (1378–1389), who complained that he did not hear enough screaming when Cardinals who had conspired against him were tortured.
Pope Alexander VI (1492–1503), a Borgia, who was guilty of nepotism and whose unattended corpse swelled until it could barely fit in a coffin.
Pope Leo X (1513–1521), a spendthrift member of the Medici family who once spent 1/7 of his predecessors' reserves on a single ceremony.
Pope Clement VII (1523–1534), also a Medici, whose power-politicking with France, Spain, and Germany got Rome sacked.

References

1969 non-fiction books
2003 non-fiction books
Books about popes
20th-century history books
21st-century history books
1969 in Christianity
Lists of celebrities